Khoren I was the name of

Khoren I Muradbekyan, Catholicos of All Armenians (1873–1938)
Khoren I Paroian, Catholicos of Cilicia (1914–1983)